Lug is a village in Croatia. It is connected by the D1 highway.

Populated places in Karlovac County